Phoenix Mountain or Hill, also known in Chinese contexts as Mount Fenghuang or Fenghuangshan, may refer to:

China
 Fenghuang Mountain (Shenzhen), Guangdong, China
 Phoenix Mountain (Hebei), China
 Phoenix Mountain (Liaoning), China
 Phoenix Hill (Shanxi), China
 Phoenix Mountain (Zhejiang), China

United States
 Phoenix Mountains in Arizona, USA
 Phoenix Hill, Louisville, Kentucky, USA